Großer Wostevitzer Teich is a lake on Jasmund peninsula of the island Rügen, Mecklenburg-Vorpommern, Germany. At an elevation of 0.2 m, its surface area is 0.743 km².

External links 
 

Lakes of Mecklenburg-Western Pomerania
Geography of Rügen